(Antarctica)

Mount Macdonald  is a peak rising to  surmounting the massive N-S trending ridge between Ludeman Glacier and Pain Neve in the Commonwealth Range. Named by New Zealand Geological Survey Antarctic Expedition (NZGSAE) (1961–62) for the Hon. T.L. Macdonald, who was Minister of External Affairs and of Defence when the Commonwealth Trans-Antarctic Expedition (CTAE) (1956–58) was being planned and who took a prominent part in obtaining New Zealand participation in the Antarctic.

References

Queen Maud Mountains
Dufek Coast
Macdonald